Iris Von Arnim (born 25 January 1945 in Berbisdorf (Dziwiszów), Silesia, today Poland) is an internationally acclaimed German fashion designer.

History
von Arnim's career began in the early 1976 when she began knitting while recovering in a hospital from a car accident. In 1976 she opened a small boutique in Munich, and debuted her collection at the CPD fashion fair in Düsseldorf. In the early 1980s, she revolutionized the German knitwear market with previously unknown intarsia and bold color combinations, and was among the first designers to introduce cashmere in Germany, which earned her the moniker “The Cashmere-Queen.” Since 1990, her knitwear collection has been complemented by matching woven and dress collections.

Today, Iris Von Arnim delivers to over 200 exclusive boutiques and department stores globally, she has her own production site in Italy and mono stores in Munich, Vienna and Kampen, Sylt. She lives in Hamburg, Germany and heads the largest European young designer competition, the Apolda European Design Award. She supports weaving mills in Cambodia, Pakistan and Mexico.

In 2006, Valentin von Arnim, her son, joined the company. Since 2009 he is general manager.

In 2010, Iris von Arnim formed a joint venture with Claudia Schiffer to develop the Claudia Schiffer Cashmere Collection. Schiffer is creative director and von Arnim is responsible for product development, production and sales.

In April 2011, von Arnim was awarded the Thuringian Order of Merit for her role in the Apolda European Design Award and for her support of the region.

In November 2012 Iris von Arnim opened a store in the city center of Munich. In June 2013, the original flagship store on the North Frisian Island of Sylt was redesigned and opened with three times the space.

In July 2013 the Iris von Arnim e-store was launched.

In August 2013 Iris von Arnim presented their first menswear collection which is called Iris von Arnim UOMO. The collection includes 15 styles, from fine knitted hoodies to chunky hand knitted sweaters and cardigans, each distinguished through particular details and craftsmanship.

In October 2013 Iris Von Arnim opened a temporary store in the center of Vienna.

References

External links 
 http://www.irisvonarnim.com
 http://www.vai-fashion.com

1945 births
Living people
German fashion designers
German women fashion designers
People from the Province of Lower Silesia
Iris